Okajima (written: 岡島, 岡嶋) is a Japanese surname. Notable people with the surname include:

 Hideki Okajima (born 1975), former Japanese professional baseball pitcher
 Kanata Okajima (born 1984), Japanese singer and songwriter
 Kiyonobu Okajima (born 1971), former Japanese football player
 Tae Okajima, Japanese voice actress
 Takero Okajima (born 1989), Japanese professional baseball catcher
, Japanese ice hockey player

Fictional characters
, a character in the Assassination Classroom anime and manga
Takeo Okajima, a character in the Studio Ghibli film Only Yesterday

Japanese-language surnames